HW & FB Tompkins was an architectural firm established by the brothers Henry (Harry) William (1865-1959) and Frank Beauchamp Tompkins (c1867-1952) in 1898 in Melbourne, Australia. They went on to become a major commerical firm, designing a large number of department stores, hotels, clubs and office buildings and banks over the next 40 years, many in central Melbourne and most still standing. They were stylistic and structural innovators, an are best known for the huge Myer Department store in Bourke Street, built in many stages in different styles from 1914 to 1933.

Early life 
The brothers were born in England, and grew up in South Africa, before arriving with their parents in Melbourne in 1886. The city at the time was in the throes of a boom, which became a bust in the early 1890s. Harry had became an assistant to architect Richard Speight, forming a partnership briefly in the mid 1890s, until 1896 he took up a position with the Public Works Department in Western Australia. Frank meanwhile worked in a number of architectural offices, including with Nahum Barnet. After being retrenched in 1898, Harry returned to Melbourne, and formed a partnership with Frank.

Architectural careers 
The brothers were immediately successful, winning a competition for clubrooms for the Commercial Travellers Association in 1898, built at 170 Flinders Street the following year (though only Harry's name was given as the architect). It was in the red brick Romanesque style (with many Queen Anne elements), a style which emerged in Melbourne at that time, and came to dominate commerical architecture in the central city, especially warehouses, over the next 10 years. 

This project was followed by the Metcalfe & Barnard warehouse on the corner of Flinders Lane and Russell Street in a similar style in 1902, and in 1908 this was followed by another Flinders Lane warehouse for Borsdorff & Co. (a renovation of an earlier building), also in red brick Romanesque style, this time with exotic horseshoe arches. They used the red brick Romanesque for two small suburban department stores, Dimmeys in Richmond in 1907 (expanded in 1918 with an elaborate clock tower), and Hoopers Store in Brunswick in 1908. They also designed a number of churches and country pubs in this period.  

From about this time and into the 1940s both Frank and Harry made frequent study trips abroad, bringing back the latest in innovations for various buildings types, new architectural approaches and new construction techniques. Harry's first trip was a tour of Europe and United Stated in 1910, and he returned "full of enthusiasm for all things American", which emerged in their next projects. The Centre Way building and arcade in Collins Street, completed 1911, was an early example of a fully steel framed structure in Melbourne. Having already extended their premises upwards twice, by 1913 the Commercial Travellers Association had grown to such an extent that they moved into new clubrooms in Flinders Street two blocks from the first in the form of a large hotel with extensive facilities for their members, such as a large billiard room and dining room, and an adjacent investment office building, and these also used a steel frame. For both projects they abandoned the Romanesque for a simpler approach, combined with the exaggerated classical details of the English Baroque Revival. The CTA hotel and office building were influenced by the American 'palazzo' style, with elaborate lower floors and cornice, and plain walls between, clad in white glazed brick, and the interior features an impressive circular lobby and elaborate plasterwork.

In 1912, Harry met Sidney Myer, who had just purchased a drapery store in Bourke Street in order to expand his Bendigo drapery business into Melbourne, and together they toured the US looking at department stores. The resulting seven storey building completed in 1914 in Bourke Street adopts a similar form to the Centre Way and CTA buildings, albeit with arches on the penultimate floor. It was reportedly inspired by the 1908 Emporium in San Francisco, though perhaps this was mainly the name and perhaps the operation, since the architectural style is quite different. The Tompkins would be the architects for the expansion of Myers over the next 20 years.   

In 1914 The Tompkin's completed another department store, for Treadways in Chapel Street, Prahran, which had become a major shopping strip with many department stores. Called the Colossuem, the design was clearly inspired by Selfridges in Oxford Street in London, completed a few years before, a commerical version of Neoclassicism, featuring giant order columns, and a large cornice. This was the first example of the Neoclassical revival that came to dominate Melbourne commerical architecture in the 1920s. Following the hiatus of WW1, their next most prominent project was the Herald and Weekly Times Building, Flinders Street, in a stripped back version of Neoclassical, with tall Ionic pilasters. The first stage was completed in 1921, with a doubling in size in 1928. Other important designs in this mode include the Bank of Australasia, cnr of Russell Street and Flinders Lane (1923), Myer Lonsdale Street expansion (1926), and the National Bank chambers in Geelong (1928). In this period they also designed some Gothic style churches, and some private homes.      

In the early 1930s like most architects they adopted the new Moderne (Art Deco) style, most notable in their design for a new enlarged Bourke Street wing of Myer, completed in 1933. Finished in white 'snowcrete', the vertical ribbing and tower-like projection made it a landmark, and the Myer Mural Hall in the central top projection is one of the grandest Art Deco interiors in Melbourne. This was followed by some other Art Deco commercial buildings, such as Diamond House, directly opposite Myers, for Dunklings jewellers, in 1936, and a showroom and warehouse for Australian Glass Manufacturers in Spencer Street, West Melbourne in 1937 that featured glass blocks extensively, but their output in the later 1930s waned, as both brothers entered their 60s.

Their prodigious output up to then, much of which remains, especially in the central city, has left of wealth of buildings. This includes remarkably a cluster of three, in three different styles, adjacent to each other on the corner of Russell Street and Flinders Lane - on the south east corner is the 1902 Romanesque Metcalfe & Barnard Warehouse, with the 1935 Art Deco Pawson House adjacent on Flinders Lane, and the 1923 Neoclassical Bank of Australasia on the north east corner.

The firm continued through the war, becoming Tompkins Shaw & Evans in the 1950s, who continued their association with Myers, designing a notable glass walled footbridge joining the two parts of the store across Little Bourke Street in 1963. In 2003 the firm became Tompkins MDA group.

Personal Lives 
Harry married in 1897, and was active in the profession, joining the Royal Victorian Institute of Architects in 1903, and serving as president in 1914-16. He also served as president of the Federal Council of the Architects Institute of Australia 1918-1919. Harry lived in Kew and was active in local affairs, serving as Mayor in the same years 1918-19, when he submitted a design for the Kew War Memorial, to be located at Kew Junction, in the form of a classical rotunda. This was completed in 1925, when he was no longer on Council, and they had rejected the results of a competition.

List of major Works 
This list mostly drawn from the Victorian Heritage database :

1899: Commercial Travellers Association clubrooms, Flinders Street. (one floor added 1906, another in 1905, only facade survives)

1902: Metcalfe & Barnard warehouse, 145 - 149 Flinders Lane, se corner of Russell Street

1904: St Andrews, Maffra,

1904: St Andrew's, Sunbury

1907: Lane Centre, Flinders Lane

1908: Borsdorff & Co warehouse (now Tomasetti House), Flinders Lane

1907+1918: Dimmey's Store, Swan Street, Richmond

1908: Hoopers Store, Sydney Road, Brunswick

1909: Paynes Bon Marche, Bourke Street (demolished)

1910: 'Danby', residence for Henry Buck (of Henry Buck's menswear), Rockley Road, South Yarra

1910: West Hawthorn Presbyterian Church (now Uniting), Power Street, Hawthorn

1912: Centre Way Arcade and building, Collins Street

1913: Commercial Travellers Association Hotel and offices, Flinders Street

1913: Melbourne Steamship Company, 27-31 King Street

1914: The Canterbury (apartments), Canterbury Road, St Kilda (another floor was added in 1919)

1914: Denyers Building, 264 Swanston Street

1914: Colosseum Department Store, Chapel Street, Prahran

1915: St Johns, Glenhuntly Road, Elsternwick

1915: National Australia Bank, Glenhuntly Road, Elsternwick

1921-1928: Herald and Weekly Times Building, Flinders Street

1923: Bank of Australasia, ne corner of Russell Street and Flinders Lane

1924: Yorkshire House, 20 Queen Street. 

1925: London Stores, Bourke Street

1925: Kew War Memorial, Kew Junction

1926: Myer, Lonsdale Street expansion (only facades survive)

1926: St Davids Methodist (now Uniting), 902A Burke Road, Canterbury

1927: St Johns, Mt Alexander Road, Essendon

1928: National Bank chambers and offices, Malop Street, Geelong

1928: 'Yarrowee', Rosehill Road, Lower Plenty

1928: Myer Despatch, Queensberry Street, Carlton

1933: Myer Bourke Street (enlarged frontage)

1933: Mantons store, Bourke Street (later enlarged as a Coles Store, facade now covered over)

1935: Pawson House, 141 Flinders Lane

1936: Diamond House, Bourke Street (only facade survives)

1936: Myer Despatch (second building), Berkeley Street, Carlton

1937: Australian Glass Manufacturers, Spencer Street, West Melbourne (only facade survives)

Tompkins Shaw & Evans

1963: Aerial walkway, joining the Myer buildings (demolished in 2010 and rebuilt in modified form)

1968: Ponsford Stand, MCG

References